Marek Mašlonka (born 17 January 1987) is a Slovak former  professional ice hockey forward.

Mašlonka began his career with HK ŠKP Poprad and made his professional debut during the 2010–11 season. He also played for MHK Kežmarok and HK Nitra before moving to Arlan Kokshetau of Kazakhstan in 2013.

Career statistics

Regular season and playoffs

External links

1987 births
Living people
Arlan Kokshetau players
Ducs de Dijon players
HK Dukla Michalovce players
Guildford Flames players
MHK Kežmarok players
HK Nitra players
HK Poprad players
Slovak ice hockey forwards
HK Spišská Nová Ves players
Sportspeople from Poprad
Slovak expatriate sportspeople in Kazakhstan
Slovak expatriate sportspeople in England
Slovak expatriate sportspeople in France
Slovak expatriate ice hockey people
Expatriate ice hockey players in France
Expatriate ice hockey players in Kazakhstan
Expatriate ice hockey players in England